Jonathon Neal Crawford (born November 1, 1991) is an American professional baseball pitcher who is a free agent. He has previously been a member of the Detroit Tigers and Cincinnati Reds organizations.

Career
Crawford attended Okeechobee High School in Okeechobee, Florida. He then enrolled at the University of Florida, where he played college baseball for the Florida Gators. On June 1, 2012 he threw a no-hitter against Bethune-Cookman. In the summer of 2012, he played for the United States collegiate national team. In his three years at Florida, he went 9–8 with a 3.51 earned run average (ERA) with 146 strikeouts.

Detroit Tigers
The Detroit Tigers drafted Crawford in the first round of the 2013 Major League Baseball draft. He signed on June 14, 2013. Crawford made his professional debut that season with the Connecticut Tigers. He finished the year with a 1.89 ERA over eight starts. In 2014, Crawford pitched for the West Michigan Whitecaps. He started 23 games, going 8–3 with a 2.85 ERA with 85 strikeouts in 123 innings.

Cincinnati Reds
On December 11, 2014, the Tigers traded Crawford and Eugenio Suárez to the Cincinnati Reds for Alfredo Simón. He began 2015 on the disabled list before beginning to rehab with the AZL Reds in late June, pitching three games for them. He then pitched two games for the Daytona Tortugas, giving up five runs in 5.1 innings, but was placed on the disabled list again, and missed the remainder of the season. In 2016, Crawford once again began the season on the disabled list, and did not begin rehabbing in the AZL until June. He returned to Daytona in August and spent the last half of the season there, pitching to a 1–3 record and 6.35 ERA in six starts. He spent 2017 back with Daytona where he was 0–10 with a 5.65 ERA ad 1.96 WHIP in 22 starts. On November 4, 2019, he elected free agency.

Team Texas
In July 2020, Crawford signed on to play for Team Texas of the Constellation Energy League (a makeshift 4-team independent league created as a result of the COVID-19 pandemic) for the 2020 season.

Chicago Dogs
On April 1, 2021, Crawford signed with the Chicago Dogs of the American Association of Professional Baseball. Crawford struggled to a 9.36 ERA in 14 appearances with the Dogs and was released on July 19.

High Point Rockers
On August 7, 2021, Crawford signed with the High Point Rockers of the Atlantic League of Professional Baseball. He became a free agent following the season. On April 8, 2022, Crawford re-signed with the Rockers for the 2022 season. Crawford made 29 appearances for the Rockers, pitching to a 4.82 ERA with 44 strikeouts in 28.0 innings of work before he was released on August 8.

Personal life
Crawford's brother, Kutter, is also a professional baseball player and made his MLB debut in 2021 with the Boston Red Sox.

References

External links

Florida Gators bio

1991 births
Living people
Baseball players from Florida
Florida Gators baseball players
Connecticut Tigers players
West Michigan Whitecaps players
High Point Rockers players
People from Okeechobee, Florida